Conrad (died 1132), Margrave of the Nordmark and Count of Plötzkau, son of Helperich, Margrave of the Nordmark, and Adele, daughter of Kuno of Northeim and Kunigunde of Weimar-Orlamünde.  Conrad, called the Saxon flower, was born in Monza, Italy.

Conrad became Margrave of Nordmark upon the death of Udo IV, who died without a male heir.  At this point in time, the position of margrave had no real power.  Nevertheless, Conrad fought with Emperor Lothair II in his Italian campaign (Italienkriegszug) of 1132, and, on 25 December 1132, he was struck by an arrow in a battle with the Normans. He died several days later and was buried in the Hecklingen Monastery.

Conrad was succeeded by the traditional heir to the margraviate, Rudolf II, son of Rudolf I.

Sources 
Heinemann, Otto von, "Konrad von Plötzkau". In: Allgemeine Deutsche Biographie, Band 16, 1182

Krause, Karl Ernst Hermann, Lothar Udo II. und das Stader Grafenhaus. In: Allgemeine Deutsche Biographie. Band 19, Duncker & Humblot, Leipzig, 1884

Medieval Lands Project (Grafen von Plötzkau)

Margraves of the Nordmark
1132 deaths
Year of birth unknown